Katreeya English (born 4 September 1976) is a Thai singer, actress and model. She has released 5 albums, the most recent of which is Sassy K on GMM Grammy. In 2015, she recorded "They Call Us The Royals", a new song for Reading F.C. of the Football League Championship.

Early life and education 
English was born to an English father and a Thai mother in Oxford. English received a Bachelor of Arts majoring in English from Assumption University, Thailand.

Discography

Studio albums

Other albums

Filmography

Films

Television series

Theater

Television presenter (MC)
 Television 
 1994 : คิดดี้แคท On Air Ch.9 (1994-1998)
 2013 : Ching Roi Ching Lan SUNSHINE DAY On Air Ch.3 with Phanya Nirunkul (Cameo) 
 2022 : The Ladies ผู้หญิงแถวหน้า On Air Mono 29 together with น้ำหวาน-พิมรา เจริญภักดี, น้ำ-ชลนที อักษรสิงห์ชัย (February 19, 2022-present)

References

Living people
1976 births
Actresses from Oxfordshire
Katreeya English
Katreeya English
Katreeya English
Katreeya English
People educated at the School of St Helen and St Katharine
People from Oxford
Katreeya English
Katreeya English
Katreeya English
Katreeya English
Katreeya English
Katreeya English
Katreeya English
Katreeya English
Katreeya English
Katreeya English
Katreeya English
Katreeya English
British emigrants to Thailand
Katreeya English